Palestinians in Jordan refers mainly to those with Palestinian refugee status currently residing there. Sometimes the definition includes Jordanian citizens with full Palestinian origin.

Most Palestinian ancestors came to Jordan as Palestinian refugees between 1947 and 1967. Today, most Palestinians and their descendants in Jordan are fully naturalized, making Jordan the only Arab country to fully integrate the Palestinian refugees of 1948.

In Jordan, there is no official census data for how many inhabitants are Palestinians and it rather depends on the definition of who is a Palestinian. Some 2.18 million Palestinians were registered as refugees in 2016. As of 2014, around 370,000 live in ten refugee camps, with the biggest one being Baqa'a refugee camp with over 104,000 residents, followed by Amman New Camp (Wihdat) with over 51,500 residents.

Palestinians are overwhelmingly concentrated in northern and central Jordan, specifically in the Amman Governorate, Zarqa Governorate and Irbid Governorate.

Notable people

This is a list of notable Palestinians in Jordan and people of Palestinian ancestry:

 Anwar Nusseibeh, politician
 Ahmad Toukan, politician
 Amer Shafi, footballer
 Emad Hajjaj, cartoonist
 Hassan Abdel-Fattah, footballer
 Ibrahim Nasrallah, poet and novelist
 Princess Firyal of Jordan, princess
 Samir al-Rifai, politician
 Queen Alia of Jordan, third wife of King Hussein
 Queen Rania of Jordan, wife of King Abdullah II
 Hanan Al-Agha, plastic artist
 , actor

See also
 Refugees of the Syrian Civil War in Jordan
 Demographics of Jordan
 1948 Palestinian exodus
 1967 Palestinian exodus
 Jordanian annexation of the West Bank
 King Hussein's federation plan
 Three-state solution

Bibliography

 Sayigh Yusuf, 1984, Al-Urdunn wa-l-Filastiniyyun, Dirasah fi Wihdat al-Masir aw al-Sira’ al-Hatmi (Arabic), London, Riyad El-Rayyis Books

References

External links
 Progress, challenges, diversity - Insights into the socio-economic conditions of Palestinian refugees in Jordan, 2013 Fafo Foundation report

 
 
Ethnic groups in Jordan
Middle Eastern diaspora in Jordan
Jordan